Ferrandino is a surname. Notable people with the surname include:

Giuseppe Ferrandino (writer) (born 1958), Italian comic book author and novelist
Giuseppe Ferrandino (politician) (born 1963), Italian MEP
Mark Ferrandino (born 1977), American politician
Rita Ferrandino (born 1963), American businesswoman